Akram Mohammadi is an Iranian  actress.
She was born on July 28, 1958, in Tehran. She started her professional career in theater in 1983 and after a while, she was invited to play in the movie "Mother" directed by the deceased famous Ali Hatami. Then, she entered television with the series "Morghe Hag"(Truth Bird) in 1984 and acted in many works.

Filmography

 One for all (2011)
 Venusian women, Martian men (2010)
 Concert on the water (2010) Dayereh-e zangi (Tambourine -2007) Sam and Narges (2000)
 Dokhtari ba kafsh-haye-katani (A Girl in Sneakers -1998) Sheida (1998)
 Sahere (Witch -1997) Darre-ye shaparakha (Valley of the Butterflies -1991) Voice of the Sea (1990)
 All the nation (1990)
 Madar (Mother - 1989)Television series
 Under the City's Skin
 Pedar Salar (The Chief-father) Tenth Night
 Khane-ye Sabz (The Green House) Sarzamine Sabz (The Green Land)  Marde Hezar Chehreh (Thousand-Face Man) Shoghe Parvaz (Flying Passion)''
 Setayesh 3

References

External links

1958 births
Living people
People from Tehran
Actresses from Tehran
Iranian film actresses
Iranian television actresses